Kingdom of Madness may refer to:
Kingdom of Madness (Edguy album), 1997
Kingdom of Madness (Magnum album), 1978
"Kingdom of Madness", a 2010 song by Freedom Call from the album Legend of the Shadowking